The Stade de la Meinau, commonly known as "La Meinau", is a football stadium in Strasbourg, France. It is the home ground of RC Strasbourg and has also hosted international matches, including one game of the 1938 World Cup, two games of Euro 1984 and the final of the Cup Winners' Cup in 1988. La Meinau has also been used as a venue for concerts and a mass by John Paul II in 1988. The stadium is owned by the Strasbourg municipality and is rented by the RC Strasbourg.

History

On 1 April 1914, as Strasbourg was still part of Germany following the Franco-Prussian War, RC Strasbourg, then called FC Neudorf, signed a 300 Deutsche Mark lease to use the Haemmerlé Garten, essentially a pitch surrounded by the woods in the then mainly rural district of Meinau. This would eventually serve as the ground where the stadium was constructed.  Between 1906 and 1914, the pitch had been used by another team, FC Frankonia, and several lawsuits were necessary to evict that team from the ground. Construction eventually proceeded and was completed in 1921 with a capacity of 30,000. During the 1938 FIFA World Cup, La Meinau hosted a first-round game that saw Brazil eliminate Poland 6–5 after extra-time thanks to a hat-trick by Leônidas who scored one of the first bicycle kicks in the history of football.

In the four decades that followed, the facility was left essentially untouched. When France won the right to host the European Championship with Strasbourg as a venue, La Meinau was rebuilt from the ground up at a cost of just over FRF 120 million. It became a compact, fully rectangular stadium with quarter-corners between the four main stands (North, South, West and East), not unlike Dortmund's Westfalenstadion. Inaugurated on April 18, 1984, two months before the Euro, La Meinau hosted a record 44,566 for the first-round match between West Germany and Portugal match (0–0). The stadium remained state-of-the-art through the 1980s and hosted the 1988 UEFA Cup Winners Cup final that saw K.V. Mechelen defeat Ajax Amsterdam 1–0.

After the tragic events of Heysel, Hillsborough and Furiani, safety regulations were reinforced, progressively limiting the number of standing places. This change severely affected La Meinau since the stadium had large standing-only terraces all around the pitch. Capacity dropped from the initial 45,000 to 26,000, all seated. Hence, in 1996, RC Strasbourg could not rely on a large attendance when they hosted AC Milan for the 1995–96 UEFA Cup. In 1993, La Meinau was considered as a strong potential candidate to host games for World Cup 1998 by Michel Platini, who organized the tournament, especially because of its proximity to Germany and Central Europe in general. However, at a time when the local team was performing erratically, the City of Strasbourg was unwilling to assume the cost of the works necessary to host the World Cup – estimated at FRF 200 million – citing other costly projects under way, especially the tram. (since Metz also declined an invitation to host the cup, there were no games in 1998 in the whole of north-eastern France).

La Meinau was last refurbished in 2001 and its current capacity for league games is 26,280. When France prepared its bid to host Euro 2016, Strasbourg came up again as a potential venue. However, RC Strasbourg had by then fallen into a steep sporting and financial decline that ultimately led to the liquidation of its professional section and a restart in the French fifth division. With no prospect of a profitable investment, the municipality withdrew from consideration as a host city and La Meinau was again left out of a major renovation and the north-east Grand Est and Bourgogne-Franche-Comté regions, with a population of 8 million, went without any active involvement in the event.

Renovation project
In May 2019, a €100m renovation project was announced, to increase the capacity to 32,300. Work is due to start in the summer of 2022, and be completed in 2025.

Records 

Record attendance: 44,566 on 14 June 1984

Record attendance for a domestic league game: 39,033 on 20 November 1992

France's national teams at La Meinau 
The France national football team has played four games in Strasbourg.

The France women's national football team has played three games in Strasbourg.

The French national rugby union team has played one game in Strasbourg.

Non-sport events

References

External links

WorldStadiums.com entry 
Page on the club's website
Racingstub fact sheet
Racingstub stadium history
Racingstub attendance stats
History at MCSinfo

Meinau
RC Strasbourg Alsace
Buildings and structures in Strasbourg
1938 FIFA World Cup stadiums
Meinau
Meinau
Sports venues in Strasbourg
Sports venues completed in 1914